Chang Guan-chung is a general officer of the Republic of China Army (ROCA) in Taiwan. He was the Vice Minister of National Defense for Armaments from 28 April 2017 to 1 July 2021.

Education
Chang obtained his doctoral degree in aeronautical engineering from Cornell University in the United States.

National Chung-Shan Institute of Science and Technology
In February 2017, Chang, as the President of National Chung-Shan Institute of Science and Technology, signed a memorandum with the Ministry of National Defense in Taichung to develop next-generation advanced jet trainers in Taiwan in which the development program will be completed by 2026.

Ministry of National Defense
Chang took office as the Vice Minister of National Defense for Armaments on 28 April 2017. He is the first academic to serve in this post. He was the opening speaker at U.S.-Taiwan Defense Industry Conference 2018 in Maryland where he spoke on the need for Taiwan to balance foreign and domestic defense suppliers. Chen stepped down from his position at the Ministry of National Defense on 1 July 2021 to work in the Presidential Office as a military strategy adviser, and was awarded the Order of the Cloud and Banner.

References

Living people
Republic of China Army generals
Cornell University College of Engineering alumni
Year of birth missing (living people)